A mark tree (also known as a nail tree,  chime tree, or set of bar chimes) is a percussion instrument used primarily for musical colour. It consists of many small chimes—typically cylinders of solid aluminium or hollow brass tubing 3/8" in diameter—of varying lengths, hung from a bar. They are played by sweeping a finger or stick through the length of the hanging chimes. They are mounted in pitch order to produce rising or falling glissandos.

Unlike tubular bells, another form of chime, the chimes on a mark tree do not produce definite pitches, as they produce inharmonic (rather than harmonic) spectra.

The mark tree is named after its inventor, studio percussionist Mark Stevens, who devised it in 1967. When he could not come up with a name, percussionist Emil Richards dubbed the instrument the "mark tree".

The mark tree should not be confused with two similar instruments: 
 Wind chimes are mounted in a circle with a hanging striker strung in the center; they may be solid or hollow and made of many types of material, whereas the mark tree is mounted in a linear fashion and normally has solid metal bars.
 The bell tree is a set of graduated cup-shaped bells mounted vertically along a center post.

See also
Chime (disambiguation)
Chime bar
Glockenspiel
Tubular bell
Wind chime

References

Musical instruments played with drum sticks
Percussion idiophones
20th-century percussion instruments
Unpitched percussion instruments
Drum kit components